San Pascual, officially the Municipality of San Pascual,  is a 3rd class municipality in the province of Masbate, Philippines. According to the 2020 census, it has a population of 44,449 people.

In addition to the northern part of Burias Island, the islands of Busing, Templo (or Iniwaran,) and another six small unpopulated islands belong to the municipality.

Geography

Barangays

San Pascual is politically subdivided into 22 barangays.

Climate

Demographics

Economy

Tourism

One of the popular tourist destinations in the municipality of San Pascual is the Sombrero Island with its pure white sand beach.

Gallery

References

External links

 [ Philippine Standard Geographic Code]
Philippine Census Information
Local Governance Performance Management System

Municipalities of Masbate